Kiss Sixth Sense is a South Korean web series based on the web novel of the same title which was made into a webtoon by Gatnyeo (Got W). Directed by Nam Ki-Hoon, written by Jeon Yu-ri and starring Yoon Kye-sang, Seo Ji-hye, and Kim Ji-seok. It tells the story of Hong Ye-sool, a woman who has the supernatural ability to see the future when she is kissed, accidentally kisses her boss, Cha Min-hoo, and sees their future together. Her life gets more entangled when Ye-sool's ex-boyfriend Lee Pil-yo comes back into her life. The series released two episodes every Wednesday at 16:00 (KST) from May 25, 2022 to June 29, 2022 exclusively on Disney+ in select regions.

Cast

Main 
 Yoon Kye-sang as Cha Min-hoo
 Moon Woo-jin as young Min-hoo
 Seo Ji-hye as Hong Ye-sool
 Lee Si-a as young Ye-sool
 Kim Ji-seok as Lee Pil-yo

Supporting

People around Min-hoo 
 Lee Joo-yeon as Oh Ji-young
 Tae In-ho as Oh Seung-taek, Min-hoo's friend 
 Lee Han-wi as Oh Kyung-soo, Min-hoo's doctor

People around Ye-sool 
 Kim Ga-eun as Ban Ho-woo, Ye-sool's cousin
 Um Hyo-sup as Kim Hae-jin
 Im Ji-kyu as young adult Hae-jin (cameo, Ep. 11-12)
 Kim Hee-jeong as Kim Sa-ra, Ye-sool's mother
 Son Eun-seo as young adult Sa-ra (cameo)

People in Zeu Ad 
 Hwang Bo-ra as Jang Um-ji
  as Kang Sang-goo
 Kim Mi-soo as Kim Min-hee
 Yoon Jung-hoon as Kim Ro-ma
 Kim Jae-hwa as Cho Seon-hee
  as Yeom Kyung-seok
  as Vice President of Zeu Ad
 Lee Yoo-jin as Zeu Ad Planning Team 2 staff
 Ho Sol-hee as Zeu Ad Planning Team 2 staff
 Park Jung-pyo as Zeu Ad set crew chief

People around Pil-yo 
Jung Ra-el as PD Yoo
 Kim Min-joong as Kim Yoon-soo, Pil-yo's assistant director
 Kim Ye-ji as Pil-yo's staff

Others 
  as Mopix Advertising Director
  as Daehan University Hospital resident
 Lee Seung-hee as Kim Joon-ho, Daehan University Hospital resident
 Kim Chang-hwan as Ji-young's manager
 Ahn Je-na as Ji-young's staff
 Kim Ki-nam as Detective Yang
  as Noel Orphanage director
  as Billy Bed director (Ep. 1-2)
 Jung Tae-ya as Billy Bed executive (Ep. 1-3)
 Jung Sae-rom as Billy Bed executive (Ep. 1-2)
 Yoon Jong-won as Piaget president (Ep. 3)
 Lee Soo-hyung as Mopix employee (Ep. 4)
 Kim Jin-ok as Ye-sool's neighbor #1 (Ep. 5)
 Han Ji-eun as Ye-sool's neighbor #2 (Ep. 5)
 Kim Shi-ah as Eun-jung's child (Ep. 5, 8)
 Lee Moon-nyung as CCTV installer (Ep. 6)
 Lee Jae-woo as Zeu Ad location manager (Ep. 6)
 Kim Chae-hyun as bridal store manager (Ep. 7)
  as Sang-goo's wife (Ep. 8)
 Lee Ji-young as Eun-jung's husband (Ep. 8)
 Kim Ga-eul as Kang Ka-eul, Sang-goo's daughter (Ep. 8)
 Han Ra-on as Kang Ra-on, Sang-goo's son (Ep. 8)
 Kwon Hye-ryung as Daehan University Hospital intern (Ep. 9)
 Song Jin-hee as reporter (Ep. 9)
  as detective (Ep. 9)

Special appearances 
 Lee Dong-gun as Hong Sung-joon, Ye-sool's father (Ep. 1, 10-12)
  as Zeu Ad editing engineer (Ep. 1)
 Yeo Hoe-hyun as cafe employee (Ep. 1)
 Han Dong-ho as Ye-sool's ex-boyfriend #1 (Ep. 1)
 Jung Gun-joo as Ye-sool's ex-boyfriend #2 (Ep. 1)
 Lee Seung-chul as homeless man (Ep. 2)
 Park Byung-eun as fishing couple husband (Ep. 3)
 Jeon Hye-bin as fishing couple wife (Ep. 3)
 Lee Jae-wook as The male lead in the movie 'Haru' (Ep. 3, 5, 9)
 Kim Sae-ron as The female lead in the movie 'Haru' (Ep. 3, 5, 9)
 Lee Mi-do as Lisa (Ep. 4)
 Baek Seung-hee as Eun-jung, Pil-yo's senior colleague (Ep. 5, 8)
 Kim Kwang-sik as Chul-yong, Sa-ra's boyfriend (Ep. 10-12)
  as Ko Sang-kyu, Kyung-seok's college classmate (Ep. 11)
Go Jun as Ji-young's co-star (Ep. 11)
  as singer (Ep. 11)
 Kim Sang-ho as director (Ep. 12)

Episodes

Production

Casting 
On August 4, 2021, Yoon Kye-sang and Seo Ji-hye received offers to play the lead roles in Kiss Sixth Sense. From August to September 2021, the cast line up was announced. The series reunites Yoon Kye-sang and Seo Ji-hye after working together as siblings in the 2004 SBS drama My 19 Year Old Sister-in-Law. On April 21, 2022, photos from the official script reading were published.

Filming 
Principal photography of the series began in October 2021 and the filming ended in mid January 2022. 

On January 5, 2022 the series canceled the scheduled filming for the day due to the sudden death of Kim Mi-soo. The filming resumed the following day after they paused filming, but there was no confirmation on whether Kim's character would be recast, or Kim's scenes were completed.

Release
On October 14, 2021, Kiss Sixth Sense was announced to be released by Disney+ at their APAC Contents Showcase. In addition to South Korea, other Disney+ Star markets with Kiss Sixth Sense scheduled for May 25, 2022 included Singapore, Hong Kong, and Taiwan. The series aired on the same date for Malaysia, Indonesia, and Thailand via Disney+ Hotstar. It was scheduled for June 29, 2022 in Japan.

Original soundtrack

The following is the official track list of Kiss Sixth Sense (Original Television Soundtrack) album. The tracks with no indicated lyricists and composers are the drama's musical score; the artists indicated for these tracks are the tracks' composers themselves. Singles included on the album were released from May 25, 2022, to June 29, 2022.

Reception
Following its release, Kiss Sixth Sense repeatedly ranked within the top five among the "Top 10 TV Shows on Disney+" in South Korea, having ranked first place on June 7th.  It also steadily ranked within the top 10 on this same list in Hong Kong, Singapore, and Taiwan while ranking in the top three of this list in Indonesia.

Notes

References

External links 
 
 
 
 Kiss Sixth Sense at Daum 

Korean-language television shows
Television shows based on South Korean novels
South Korean web series
Star (Disney+) original programming
2022 South Korean television series debuts
2022 South Korean television series endings
South Korean pre-produced television series